The UConn Huskies softball team represents the University of Connecticut in the sport of college softball in at the Division I level of the NCAA. The team was founded in the spring of the 1974–1975 academic school year, and is a member of the Big East Conference (Big East). They play their home games at Connecticut Softball Stadium on campus in Storrs, Connecticut.

In its inaugural season the UConn Huskies compiled a 4–4 overall record.  The Huskies are currently led by first-year head coach Laura Valentino, who succeeded Jen McIntyre in 2019. McIntyre succeeded Karen Mullins in 2015.  Mullins led the Huskies to an 849–558–5 record over 30 years in Storrs.

During their tenure in the Big East Conference, the Huskies claimed 7 Big East Conference softball tournament titles, six regular season championships and reached the 1993 Women's College World Series.

Head coaches

This table is complete through the 2020 season.

See also
List of NCAA Division I softball programs

References